Kao Cheng-yan is an activist and founding chair of the Green Party Taiwan and a member of the Taiwan Environmental Protection Union.  He was a Taiwan independence activist during his student years in the United States.  He ran for the Legislative Yuan on a Green Party ticket in 1998 and 2001 but failed to gain a seat.

In the 2004 ROC referendum, he debated DPP Legislator You Ching. In November 2019, Kao was ranked second on Green Party Taiwan's party list of legislative candidates contesting the 2020 elections.

He opposes the completion of the Lungmen Nuclear Power Plant, leading the campaign to gather more than 120,000 signatures in order to add a referendum to the national ballot. His opposition to nuclear power dates back to 1979.

Professionally, he is a professor in Computer Science (Bioinformatics) at the National Taiwan University.

References

Selected works

External links
 
 

Taiwan independence activists
Living people
Year of birth missing (living people)
Taiwanese environmentalists
Taiwanese computer scientists
Academic staff of the National Taiwan University
Taiwanese bioinformaticians